Vajiha Samadova (24 November 1924 – 24 October 1965) was a painter and Honored Art Worker of the Azerbaijan SSR.

Biography
Vajiha Samadova was born on November 24, 1924 in Baku. Her father Karbalai Ali was from Kars. Before she was born, Karbalai Ali moved to Iravan, later to Baku. Her mother Rubaba was from Iran. Vajiha Samadova's parents met in Old City (Baku). In 1939-1944 she studied at Painting School named after Azim Azimzade. Then she was accepted to Surikov Moscow Art Institute. Famous Russian painter Pavel Korin was her teacher. She successfully defended her thesis "Uzeyir Hajibeyov students" in 1951. She continued her postgraduate study for three years. Vajiha Samadova is the first professional female painter in Azerbaijan.

Vajiha Samadova went on creative trips to the regions of Azerbaijan with her husband Latif Fayzullayev. After these trips she created "Music", "Preparation for the wedding", "Goy gol", "Kapaz", "Cotton growers", "portrait of Leyla Badirbeyli", "portrait of Shamama Hasanova", "portrait of Minira Mammadbayli" and other paintings. At the same time Vajiha Samadova worked as a teacher at Painting School.

Her personal exhibition was held in Baku in 1962, after trip to Bulgaria. Vajiha Samadova's exhibitions were not only in Baku, also in Moscow and Sofia.
With her impressions of the trip she created "Old Bulgarian Women", "Bazaar in Sofia", "Rainy Day", "Houses on the Rocks" and others.

In 1963 she painted her last work "Waiting for News", and the painting was demonstrated at the exhibition "Our Contemporary".

Vajiha Samadova died from cancer on October 25, 1965 in Baku.

On July 14, 2018 the exhibition "Love Tandem" consist of Latif Fayzullaev's and Vajiha Samadova's paintings opened in France, Cannes, organized by the Heydar Aliyev Foundation.

References

Azerbaijani painters
Azerbaijani women painters
Soviet painters
1924 births
1965 deaths
Artists from Baku
Portrait painters